Mount Zion High School is a secondary school in Jonesboro, Georgia, United States.

Notable alumni
 Maurice Leggett, Class of 2004, Canadian football player, also played for the Kansas City Chiefs in the NFL

References

Public high schools in Georgia (U.S. state)
Schools in Clayton County, Georgia
Educational institutions established in 1990
1990 establishments in Georgia (U.S. state)